Francesc "Cesc" Fàbregas Soler (born 4 May 1987) is a Spanish professional footballer who plays as a central midfielder for Italian Serie B club Como.

Fàbregas came through La Masia, Barcelona's youth academy, leaving at 16 when he was signed by Premier League club Arsenal in September 2003. Following injuries to key midfielders in the early part of the 2004–05 season, he went on establish himself in the team. He broke several of the club's records in the process, earning a reputation as one of the best players in his position, and won the FA Cup in 2005. After a protracted transfer saga, Fàbregas left London on 15 August 2011 to return to Barcelona in a deal worth up to £35 million. During his three-year spell at the Camp Nou, Fàbregas played alongside Xavi and Andrés Iniesta and won a La Liga title, the Copa del Rey, the FIFA Club World Cup, the UEFA Super Cup and two Spanish Super Cups. He returned to London in June 2014 to Arsenal's cross-town rivals Chelsea for a fee of £30 million, and in his first year there he helped to secure League Cup and Premier League triumphs.

Internationally, Fàbregas made his debut for the Spanish national team in March 2006. He represented his country in the 2006 FIFA World Cup, UEFA Euro 2008, 2009 FIFA Confederations Cup, 2010 World Cup, Euro 2012, 2013 Confederations Cup, the 2014 World Cup and Euro 2016. He was a key figure in Spain's European Championship victories in 2008 and 2012 and their 2010 World Cup triumph in which he supplied the pass for Andrés Iniesta's winning goal in the final. On 12 October 2015, Fàbregas earned his 100th cap for Spain.

Early years 
Born in Arenys de Mar, Barcelona, Catalonia, to Francesc Fàbregas Sr., who runs a property company, and Núria Soler, the owner of a pastry company, Fàbregas has supported FC Barcelona since childhood and went to his first match when he was nine months old with his grandfather. He began his club football career with CE Mataró before being signed for Barcelona's La Masia youth academy aged ten in 1997. His first coach, Señor Blai, reportedly did not select Fàbregas for matches against Barcelona in an attempt to hide him from their scouts. This tactic, however, was unable to withstand Barcelona for long, and Mataró gave in and allowed Fàbregas to train with Barcelona one day per week. Eventually Fàbregas joined Barcelona's academy full-time. His initial training was as a defensive midfielder playing alongside notable names such as Gerard Piqué and Lionel Messi. Although he was a prolific scorer, sometimes scoring even more than 30 goals in a season for the club's youth teams, he did not manage to play a first-team game at the Camp Nou. During his time at Barcelona's youth academy, Fàbregas idolised Barcelona's then-captain and number four Pep Guardiola, who would later give Fàbregas his shirt as consolation when Fàbregas' parents divorced.

Club career

Arsenal

Adapting to England 

Sensing that he would have limited opportunities at Barcelona, Fàbregas joined Premier League club Arsenal in their Academy, signing for the London club on 11 September 2003. Initially, he found life difficult in England's capital but soon struck a friendship with Spanish-speaking teammate Philippe Senderos, who helped him settle down. As a 16-year-old, Fàbregas did not contemplate breaking into the first team immediately but looked up to senior players like Patrick Vieira and Gilberto Silva, while concentrating on training and learning the English language. He nevertheless made his debut for Arsenal not long after, on 28 October 2003, in a League Cup tie at home to Rotherham United. In doing so, he became Arsenal's youngest-ever first team player, aged 16 years and 177 days. He then became the youngest goalscorer in Arsenal's history in a later round of the League Cup, scoring in a 5–1 victory against Wolverhampton Wanderers. Although Arsenal went on to win the league unbeaten in the 2003–04 season, Fàbregas was not awarded a winner's medal because he did not play a single league game.

It was not until the start of the 2004–05 season that the Spaniard started making first team appearances in matches outside the League Cup. His first match of the season was against Manchester United in the FA Community Shield. Following an injury to Vieira, Fàbregas stepped in and made four consecutive Premier League starts. He was praised for his performances in those games, even claiming a goal against Blackburn Rovers in a 3–0 victory, and becoming Arsenal's youngest-ever goalscorer in a league game. With further injuries to Edu and Gilberto Silva, he received more playing time in all competitions. He signed his first professional contract with Arsenal in September 2004, which committed his long-term future to the club. In October 2004, Arsenal lost 2–0 to Manchester United, ending their 49-match unbeaten run in the Premier League. The match was dubbed the "Battle of the Buffet" after pizza was thrown at Manchester United manager Sir Alex Ferguson at the end of the match in the players' tunnel by a then-unknown Arsenal player. Speculation that the player was Fàbregas was confirmed in November 2011 by former Arsenal player Martin Keown on a phone-in show on BBC Radio 5 Live. In the 2004–05 UEFA Champions League, he became the second-youngest goalscorer in the competition's history after scoring the third goal against Rosenborg in a 5–1 win. He concluded his season by winning his first honours with Arsenal when he was in the starting eleven that defeated Manchester United on penalties in the 2005 FA Cup Final.

Making the starting eleven 
After The Gunners' move to the Emirates Stadium in summer 2006, Fàbregas was given the number 4 shirt, which had been vacated by Patrick Vieira following his transfer to Juventus the previous year. He featured regularly in the Arsenal central midfield alongside Gilberto Silva. He made 49 appearances in all competitions during the 2005–06 season. Despite his young age, his performances came under greater scrutiny due to his increased involvement in the first team. Further, as Fàbregas possessed a smaller frame and played with less aggression than Vieira, there were initially doubts over his ability to fill in the void left by the Frenchman. Nevertheless, Fàbregas asserted his own style of play and impressed pundits in the Champions League against Real Madrid and Juventus. In the latter, he scored Arsenal's first goal and set up Thierry Henry for the second, at the same time proving that he could compete against tough, hard-tackling midfielders like Vieira. He then played in the Final against his former club Barcelona, but Arsenal were defeated 2–1, completing a trophyless 2005–06 campaign for Arsenal.

Fàbregas' increase in exposure drew transfer speculation during the summer; Real Madrid expressed a desire to sign the Spaniard despite his long-term contract with Arsenal, but Arsenal manager Arsène Wenger stated that Arsenal would not listen to any offers. In September 2006, with six years left on his deal, Arsenal offered a new five-year deal (with an option to extend by a further three years) to the midfielder, which he signed on 19 October 2006. While the contract was unusually long, Fàbregas cited Arsenal's playing style and Wenger as reasons for his long-term commitment to the club.

The 2006–07 season was a learning experience for the young Arsenal squad and Fàbregas. The club again failed to secure any major honours and were defeated by city rivals Chelsea in the League Cup Final. Fàbregas, however, emerged as one of the key creative players for the team, playing in every single league game. He kick-started Arsenal's 2006–07 UEFA Champions League campaign when he scored a brace in a 3–0 win over Dinamo Zagreb in a qualifier match. In the Premier League, he notched up 13 assists, which was the second-highest total in the league. He ended the season with several individual honours, including the Golden Boy award, presented by the Italian paper TuttoSport, based on a poll of leading writers across Europe. He was also named in the 2006 UEFA Team of the Year, and named FA Premier League Player of the Month for January 2007. Additionally, he was nominated for both PFA Players' Player of the Year and PFA Young Player of the Year, although both awards went to Manchester United's Cristiano Ronaldo. In June 2007, he was named Arsenal's Player of the Season, taking in 60% of the votes.

The 2007–08 season began with much uncertainty for Arsenal. First, David Dein, the club's vice-chairman, left amidst allegations of internal strife, followed by the departure of the club's all-time top goalscorer and captain, Thierry Henry, who signed for Barcelona. There was also speculation over Wenger's future with the club. Fàbregas knew that he would become the most important player for Arsenal, but stated he was ready for the challenge. He started the season well, chalking up goals and assists, and website soccernet attributed the early success of Arsenal to the young Spaniard. His start to the season also earned him the O2 Player of the Month award from Arsenal fans for August, September and October, as well as the Premier League Player of the Month for September. With Arsenal leading the league table until March, Fàbregas was equally instrumental in the club's 2007–08 Champions League campaign; in the return leg against Milan, the midfielder scored late in the game to send Arsenal into the quarter-finals. Though Arsenal ended the season trophyless, Fàbregas amassed several personal awards. On 11 April 2008, Fàbregas was nominated for the PFA Player of the Year and PFA Young Player of the Year awards for the second year running; he was later crowned the winner of the latter, and named in the PFA Team of the Year. He was also named the 2007–08 Arsenal.com Player of the Season.

Captaincy 

On 24 November 2008, 14 league games into the 2008–09 season, Fàbregas was named as the successor to William Gallas as club captain. However, just as Arsenal were getting back into the title race after a poor start to the season, the Spaniard was ruled out for four months after sustaining a knee injury against Liverpool. The Gunners eventually finished the season without any silverware, coming in fourth in the league and being knocked out at the semi-finals of the 2008–09 Champions League campaign. In tandem with Arsenal's policy to groom its young players, the team that Fàbregas led into the new season consisted mostly of the same young nucleus as before, with the likes of Nicklas Bendtner, Gaël Clichy, Abou Diaby, Denílson, Samir Nasri, Alex Song and Theo Walcott in tow.

In the opening league game of 2009–10 season, Fàbregas scored a brace and managed two assists in Arsenal's 6–1 away win against Everton. Arsenal went on to secure qualification for the 2009–10 Champions League campaign by beating Celtic over two legs, but their early momentum to the season was disrupted by consecutive league game losses to Manchester United and Manchester City. The team bounced back strongly after this setback, and with Fàbregas being prolific in scoring and setting up his teammates, it went unbeaten in the next 13 games. Despite suffering four league losses even before mid-season approached, Arsenal managed to lead the league standings after 22 games. On 31 March 2010, in the Champions League first leg of the quarter-final against Barcelona, Fàbregas suffered a leg fracture before scoring the equalising goal in the game which ended 2–2. Arsenal, who were four points behind league leaders Manchester United, were deprived of their captain for the remaining six league games of the season; they were subsequently eliminated by Barcelona in the Champions League, and fell out of the league title race. Fàbregas was later named to the PFA Team of the Year.

Before the start of the 2010–11 season, there was once again intense media speculation about the Spaniard's future, and in June 2010, a €35 million bid from Barcelona was rejected. The 2010–11 season turned out to be an extremely competitive one in the Premier League; even though Arsenal had lost five games before mid-season, they were jostling for pole position with Manchester United and Manchester City. Going into late February, Arsenal were still in contention for the quadruple, but within a span of two weeks they lost in the League Cup final, were eliminated by Barcelona in the Round of 16 of the Champions League, and defeated in the FA Cup quarter-final. Although Fàbregas did not play in the League Cup Final, it was his misplaced backheel pass during the second leg of the Champions League game against Barcelona that allowed them to level the aggregate score. Arsenal remained in contention for the league title until a series of draws in the final third of the season caused them to fall too far behind league leaders Manchester United; they ended the season fourth. The following season was once again marked by uncertainty. Barcelona made several bids for Fàbregas, while Nasri, Arsenal's star performer the previous campaign, was courted by Manchester City.

Barcelona

2011–12 season 

On 15 August 2011, Barcelona signed Fàbregas for an initial fee of €29 million with a further €5 million in variables, plus Fàbregas would pay Arsenal €1 million a year from his wage for five years, ending one of the most protracted transfer sagas in recent times. Statistics show that in the five years prior to Fàbregas's departure from Arsenal, Fàbregas created 466 goal-scoring chances, made 86 assists and scored 48 goals, all three statistics topping those of new teammates Xavi and Andrés Iniesta, despite both having made more appearances in the same period.

Fàbregas joined a team that had won three La Liga titles in a row and two Champions League titles in three years, and one that featured the likes of Lionel Messi, Xavi, Andrés Iniesta and David Villa. He made his debut in the second leg of the Supercopa de España, coming on as a substitute against Real Madrid. Fàbregas drew a red card in the 90+4th after being the target of a dangerous challenge from Marcelo. Barcelona won the tie 3–2 and 5–4 on aggregate. He scored his first goal in a 2–0 win against Porto as Barcelona won the 2011 UEFA Super Cup, and his first league goal on his league debut, a 5–0 home win over Villarreal. He went on to score three more league goals in the month of September, including a late equaliser in the 2–2 away draw to Valencia.

Fàbregas then spent the majority of October sidelined with a hamstring injury picked up on international duty. He made his return, and scored, in a 4–0 away victory to Viktoria Plzeň in the Champions League. He then made his league return in the 2–2 draw away to Athletic Bilbao, scoring a goal in the same match. Fàbregas then went on to score a brace in a 5–0 home victory against Levante before netting in a 3–1 away victory against Real Madrid. Fàbregas later scored against Brazilian club Santos to help Barcelona to a 4–0 victory in the 2011 FIFA Club World Cup final.

Fàbregas got another brace in a 4–0 victory against Osasuna in the Copa del Rey. He also scored in the semi-final of the competition against Valencia to help Barcelona to the final with a 3–1 win on aggregate. He kept a regular run in the Barcelona side for the rest of the season, including appearances in both semi-final legs of the 3–2 aggregate defeat to Chelsea in the Champions League, and a substitute appearance in the 3–0 victory against Athletic Bilbao in the Copa del Rey final.

Fàbregas ended his first season at Barcelona by winning the 2011–12 Copa del Rey, 2011 Supercopa de España, 2011 UEFA Super Cup and the 2011 FIFA Club World Cup, notching 15 goals and 20 assists in 48 appearances and four best midfielder awards.

2012–13 season 
Fàbregas ended his long goal drought for his club when he scored his first league goals of the season with a brace against Sevilla in a 3–2 away victory. He then scored three goals in October, coming in the league, Champions League and the Copa del Rey. He scored again on 25 November in a 4–0 win away to Levante. On 13 January 2013, Fàbregas scored in a 3–1 win away to Málaga. Fàbregas scored his first hat-trick of his career against Mallorca in a 5–0 victory on 6 April 2013. He ended his second season at Barcelona by winning the first league title of his career, with a record 100 points. Barcelona were eliminated, however, in the semi-finals of both the Copa del Rey, to rivals Real Madrid, and the Champions League, to winners Bayern Munich. Fàbregas ended the season with 14 goals and 12 assists in 48 appearances in all competitions.

2013–14 season 
Barcelona began the season by winning the Supercopa de España. In the opening game of the league season on 18 August, Fàbregas provided five assists in a 7–0 win over Levante. He scored 8 goals in 36 league matches, including braces in away wins over Granada on 10 November and Getafe on 22 December, the latter including a penalty kick. He also scored the only goal of the game on 1 October as Barcelona won away at Celtic in the group stage of the Champions League, heading in Alexis Sánchez's cross in the 73rd minute.

Chelsea 

On 12 June 2014, Premier League club Chelsea signed Fàbregas on a five-year contract for a fee in the region of €33 million. Following his transfer he took the number 4 shirt, previously worn by David Luiz. Fàbregas spoke of his transfer, saying, "I asked Barcelona to find a way for me to leave the club. The president tried to stop the sale, but I already had my mind made up." He went on to say, "If I didn't think that I'd be happy at Chelsea, I would've never made this decision. Above all, I want to be happy both professionally and personally."

2014–15 season 
Fàbregas made his competitive debut for Chelsea on 18 August as the team began their league season away to Burnley; he played the full 90 minutes of a 3–1 victory, providing two assists. He was a nominee for the Premier League Player of the Month in August 2014, with the accolade going instead to another new Chelsea signing, Diego Costa. On 13 September 2014, after providing two assists in Chelsea's 4–2 victory over Swansea City, Fàbregas became the first player ever in Premier League history to record at least one assist in six successive games; four under Chelsea and two under Arsenal during the 2010–11 season. Four days later, he scored his first goal for the club, opening a 1–1 draw at home against Schalke 04 in Chelsea's first match of the Champions League group stage.

His first league goal for Chelsea gave them a 2–1 win at Crystal Palace on 18 October, capping off a 19-pass move. Fàbregas also completed 123 passes, the most by any player on either side. On 10 December, with Chelsea already through to the knockout stage as group winners, Fàbregas scored an eighth-minute penalty to open a 3–1 Champions League victory over Sporting CP. Twelve days later he scored a second league goal, set up by Eden Hazard and concluding a 2–0 win away to Stoke.

Fàbregas was fitted with a protective mask after breaking his nose in a collision with Charlie Adam during the reverse fixture on 4 April. Eight days later, he scored the only goal of the game in the 88th minute in a victory over Queens Park Rangers at Loftus Road. On 3 May, the day before his 28th birthday, he won his first Premier League title at the ninth attempt, following a 1–0 home win over Crystal Palace. During the penultimate game of the season, away at The Hawthorns against West Bromwich Albion, Fàbregas was shown the red card and booed off by fans for deliberately kicking the ball at Chris Brunt's head while players were speaking to referee Mike Jones. On appeal, the suspension for this red card was cut from three matches to one.

2015–16 season 
Fàbregas scored his first goal of the season on 16 September, as Chelsea defeated Maccabi Tel Aviv 4–0 in the Champions League. He, Costa and Oscar were jeered by the crowd in December after the dismissal of Mourinho, with the supporters believing that the trio's conduct and poor performances were more culpable for the team's poor form. His first league goal came in a 3–3 home draw against Everton on 15 January 2016 and his second came in a 2–1 away win against Southampton on 27 February 2016. On 19 March 2016, Fàbregas scored a free-kick as well as a penalty in 2–2 home draw against local rivals West Ham United. Fàbregas scored Chelsea's last goal of the season after converting a penalty in the 1–1 draw against new Premier League champions, Leicester City.

2016–17 season 
Fàbregas was linked with a move away from London after he was an unused substitution in the 2016–17 Premier League opener against West Ham. On 20 August 2016, Fàbregas once again started on the bench against Watford, entering the match in the second half to replace Nemanja Matić and creating an assist for Diego Costa, who scored the winner in a 2–1 victory. In the post-match press conference, Fàbregas earned the praise of manager, Conte, for his inspiring performance in the comeback win as well as the attitude he shows during training sessions. Fàbregas's first two goals of the season came in an EFL Cup tie against Leicester City on 20 September, both coming within two minutes of each other in extra time to win the game 4–2, the victory moving Chelsea on to the Round of 16.

After a month long absence due to an injury, Fàbregas played a full 90 minute to for Chelsea u23 against Southampton u23 on 21 November 2016. During the match, he provided two assists to fellow first team player, Michy Batshuayi, and helped earn a 3–2 victory. Fàbregas saw his first league action since September in a game against Manchester City on 3 December 2016. Chelsea were trailing 1–0 when Fàbregas picked out Diego Costa with a long ball into the box. Costa brought the ball down and fired it into the net to equalise. Fàbregas came off the bench against West Bromwich Albion on 11 December 2016 and immediately made an impact on the deadlocked match, finding Diego Costa once again with a long ball that led to the winning goal. On 14 December 2016, Fàbregas led Chelsea to their tenth consecutive league victory with his first league goal of the season, scoring in the 40th minute against Sunderland. In his fifth league start of the season, on 31 December 2016, Fàbregas recorded his 100th Premier League assist in his 293rd appearance in Chelsea's 4–2 home victory over Stoke City; he became the fastest player in Premier League history to reach this landmark, taking 74 fewer appearances than Ryan Giggs.

On 4 February 2017, Fàbregas scored against former club Arsenal when he collected goalkeeper Petr Cech's poor clearance and chipped the ball back over him. He did not celebrate the goal out of respect to his former club. On 25 February, Fàbregas marked his 300th Premier League appearances with a goal and an assist as Chelsea defeated Swansea City 3–1. In the same match, he also reached 102 assists in the Premier League, equalling Frank Lampard as the league's second-highest provider of all time.

Subsequent seasons 

In the 2017–18 season, Fàbregas made 49 appearances in all competitions, scoring three goals in a campaign which saw Chelsea win the FA Cup against Manchester United. He played the entire 90 minutes in the final.

Fàbregas opened his account for the 2018–19 season, scoring the winner against Derby County in the fourth round of the EFL Cup. The Blues triumphed 3–2 at Stamford Bridge.

Monaco 
On 11 January 2019, Fàbregas signed for Monaco on a deal until June 2022. On 13 January, Fàbregas made his league debut in a 1–1 draw against Marseille. On 2 February, Fabregas scored his first league goal of the season for Monaco in a 2–1 win against Toulouse. On 20 November 2020, Fàbregas scored the winning goal for Monaco in a 3–2 win over Paris Saint-Germain, which was their first win against PSG since August 2016.

Como 
On 1 August 2022, Fàbregas was unveiled as a new player for Serie B club Como, signing a two-year contract.

International career

Youth team 

Although he features regularly for the Spain national football team, Fàbregas' international career began at youth level. At the 2003 FIFA U-17 World Championship held in Finland, he finished as top scorer of the tournament despite playing in midfield, and was voted Player of the Tournament. Spain finished runners-up in the tournament to Brazil. Fàbregas was next involved in the 2004 UEFA U-17 European Championship, where Spain also finished runners-up. He was named the Golden Player of the tournament by FIFA.

Senior team 

After emerging as one of Arsenal's key players in only his second season at the club, it did not take long for Fàbregas to be called up to the senior squad. Noting his impressive performances in Arsenal's 2006 Champions League campaign, Spain coach Luis Aragonés named the teenager in the team for a friendly against Ivory Coast. In that game, Fàbregas became the youngest player capped for Spain in 70 years, beating Sergio Ramos' record. He received favourable reviews for his début, and was involved in the build-up to Spain's first goal in the 3–2 victory over the Ivorians.

2006 World Cup 
On 15 May 2006, Fàbregas was selected for the Spanish 2006 FIFA World Cup squad. During the tournament, he came on as a second-half substitute in Spain's first two group matches, contributing an assist to striker Fernando Torres in their 3–1 victory against Tunisia. He then started alongside Spain's reserve players (including then-Arsenal teammate José Antonio Reyes) in Spain's third group match against Saudi Arabia. He earned a starting role in Spain's first knockout-stage match against France, in place of Marcos Senna, but Spain lost 3–1. Fàbregas also became the youngest player in Spanish football history to participate in a World Cup when he came on as a substitute for Luis García after 77 minutes in the 4–0 victory against Ukraine on 13 June 2006; he was then 19 years and 41 days old. He was later nominated for the Gillette Young Player of the World Cup, but Germany's Lukas Podolski won the award.

UEFA Euro 2008 

In UEFA Euro 2008, Fàbregas was handed the squad number 10, rather than 18 which he had previously held. Despite featuring mostly as a substitute, the midfielder made a considerable impact in Spain's campaign. He scored his first international goal in that competition in Spain's 4–1 win over Russia and also had an assist in that game. Spain won all three of their group games and met Italy in the quarter-finals. In that match, Fàbregas scored the winning penalty in the penalty shoot-out after the teams remained deadlocked 0–0 after extra time. In the semi-finals, Spain defeated Russia 3–0 with Fàbregas providing two assists. The midfielder made the starting eleven in the Final against Germany where Spain prevailed 1–0; this was Spain's first major title since 1964. For his efforts, Fàbregas was named in the Team of the Tournament, a 23-man squad selected by the UEFA Technical Team.

2009 Confederations Cup 

After missing out for several months due to his injury, Fàbregas regained his place as a regular in Vicente del Bosque's squad. In June, he was named in the team for the 2009 FIFA Confederations Cup. He scored his second international goal in a 5–0 win against New Zealand in the competition's group stage. In the semi-finals against the United States (which Fàbregas started), Spain suffered a shock 2–0 loss, and its 15-game winning streak came to an end.

2010 World Cup 

Fàbregas was selected as a part of del Bosque's 23-man squad for the 2010 FIFA World Cup. With del Bosque preferring a starting midfield of Sergio Busquets, Xabi Alonso, Xavi and Andrés Iniesta, Fàbregas did not start in any of Spain's games in the competition. He featured as a substitute in four of their seven matches, in which Spain lost their opening game before winning the next six en route to the final. In the Final itself, Fàbregas set up the extra-time winner for Iniesta to win Spain the World Cup for the first time in their history.

UEFA Euro 2012 

Fàbregas was selected as a part of del Bosque's 23-man squad for UEFA Euro 2012.
Fàbregas started in the centre of the front three of a 4–3–3 formation against Italy in Spain's opening Group C match, essentially acting as a false 9. In the 64th minute he scored the equaliser after Italy had taken the lead in the 61st minute; the game finished in a 1–1 draw. He then scored his second goal of the tournament in the next group stage match against Ireland, which ended in a 4–0 win to Spain. When Spain faced Portugal in the semi-finals and the game remained scoreless at the end of extra time, Fàbregas scored the winning penalty of the shootout as Spain prevailed 4–2. In the final against Italy, Fàbregas started and provided the assist to David Silva for the game's opening goal, en route to a 4–0 Spain victory.

2013 Confederations Cup 

Fàbregas was named in the provisional squad in the lead up to the 2013 Confederations Cup by del Bosque. He made two starts in the competition and one substitute appearance, all during the group stage of the competition, and assisting a goal in Spain's opening group match against Uruguay, which Spain won 2–1. Spain won all their group matches, only conceding a goal and scoring 15. Spain advanced to the final of the competition for the first time, after a lengthy and difficult semi-final clash in a re-match against their opponents of the European Championship Final of the previous year, Italy. The match ended 0–0 after extra time and Spain won 7–6 in the resulting penalty shoot-out, but were eventually defeated 3–0 in the final by hosts and defending champions Brazil.

2014 World Cup 

Fàbregas was named in Spain's 30-man provisional squad for the World Cup, and was also included in the final list for the tournament. He made his debut in the tournament in the opening 1–5 defeat to the Netherlands, replacing David Silva for the last 12 minutes. With Spain already eliminated, he played 22 minutes of 3–0 win against Australia in the last group game, this time in place of Santi Cazorla.

UEFA Euro 2016 

On 31 March 2015, Fàbregas captained Spain for the first time, in their 0–2 friendly defeat to the Netherlands at the Amsterdam Arena. He earned his 100th cap on 12 October 2015, becoming the tenth Spaniard to do so, in a UEFA Euro 2016 qualifying match against Ukraine with Spain already qualified. In his milestone match at the Olympic Stadium in Kyiv, he won a first-half penalty when fouled by Oleksandr Kucher, but his spot kick was saved by Andriy Pyatov. He started all of Spain's matches at the finals, being substituted in each of the three group games and playing the entirety of the defeat by Italy in the Round of 16 which ended their participation.

2018 World Cup 

Fàbregas was not selected for the Spain squad for the 2018 FIFA World Cup (his Chelsea colleagues Pedro, Álvaro Morata and Marcos Alonso were also overlooked after the club's disappointing season); he instead joined the BBC as a studio analyst for the tournament.

Style of play

Arsenal 

Originally brought to Arsenal as a youth to slowly develop via the League Cup, Fàbregas was unexpectedly deployed as Arsenal's starting central midfielder following a midfield injury crisis during the 2004–05 season. At the time, defensive midfielder Vieira served as his role model and mentor, and he styled his game after his childhood hero and compatriot Pep Guardiola, whose shirt number 4 he would inherit in his subsequent move to Barcelona in 2011. Because he was of a different mould from his Arsenal predecessors who played in the same position, this led to criticisms of his lightweight frame and less aggressive style of play, due to his development in the Barcelona Youth Academy, with former teammate Ashley Colecriticising the Spaniard as "an unproven featherweight" in his autobiography.

However, it did not take long for Fàbregas to become one of the most coveted and celebrated young talents in the game with his success at Arsenal. Functioning mostly as a playmaker and renowned for his passing range, he was described as the general of Arsenal's first team, bringing vision, creativity, and an innate understanding of timing and space to Arsenal's intricate passing game, displaying maturity that belied his age. He was the main creative force when he was at Arsenal, as exemplified by his 16 assists in all competitions in the 2006–07 season. Between 2006–07 and 2010–11, Fàbregas created the most chances in the top-division leagues of England, Spain, Italy, Germany and France.

Fàbregas quickly started assuming responsibility for set pieces, taking corners, free kicks and penalties. After the 2007–08 season, Fàbregas began maturing as a goalscorer, scoring 11 goals in his first 16 games, prompting Arsene Wenger to compare the Spaniard to Michel Platini. In his later seasons, Fàbregas matured to become an offensive talisman & game-winner for Arsenal, alongside the likes of Robin Van Persie & Samir Nasri. Through his career at Arsenal, Fàbregas played as a central midfielder in a two-man midfield pivot (usually next to a more defensive player like Edu, Vieira, Gilberto Silva, Flamini or Diaby), a box-to-box 'number 8' in a three-man midfield, & later as a 'number 10' in his prime.

Barcelona and Spain 

At Barcelona, Fàbregas continued to play a prominent midfield and playmaking role, although he was moved into a less talismanic role than that which he had occupied at Arsenal. His new surroundings at Barcelona were comparable with what he had played with the Spanish national team. In Pep Guardiola's 4–3–3 formation, he was suggested to be a good profile fit for the trademark patient, attacking, "tiki-taka" build-up style of play, also associated in the international setup under Luis Aragonés and Vicente del Bosque. Fàbregas was used in a variety of different roles under Guardiola. Due to the presence of Xavi, Sergio Busquets and Andrés Iniesta in the three-man midfield, as well as the emerging Thiago, Fàbregas was often employed out of position as a winger, or even as a supporting forward under Guardiola. He regularly performed in the role that Lionel Messi had  occupied during the previous season, functioning as a false-9 in a 4–6–0 formation (a role which he would also play for Spain at Euro 2012 under Del Bosque), whilst Messi would play as a right winger or second forward. Fàbregas was used in deeper roles on occasion, as an attacking, deep-lying or central playmaking midfielder, in particular under Guardiola's immediate successors, Tito Vilanova and Gerardo Martino. While Fàbregas' time at Barcelona was deemed to be successful, critics argued that there was a sense that he was not used to his maximum ability as at Arsenal & 'shoe-horned' under Guardiola rather than given a consistent midfield berth like Iniesta or Xavi, an admission that Fàbregas himself acknowledged.

Chelsea 
Upon returning to England, Fàbregas moved back to playing a playmaking role in midfield, using his technique, ball control and vision to dictate the tempo of play. He was often supported by defensive midfielders in order to give him more space and time on the ball due to his then-deteriorating lack of pace & athleticism. In this deeper creative position, although playing in a significantly less dynamic role than at Arsenal or Barcelona, he still excelled in Mourinho's system, where he proved to be an effective assist-provider. In his penultimate seasons at Chelsea, Fàbregas was given a more limited role - often coming off the bench in efforts to wrangle technical control of the midfield or to provide further creative pressure against low blocks.

Outside football

Personal life 
Fàbregas married his long time Lebanese girlfriend Daniella Semaan in May 2018. Together they have three children, daughters Lia (born 2013), Capri (born 2015), and son Leonardo (born 2017). In July 2013, Fàbregas won a court case over the marital home with Semaan's ex-husband.

In July 2019 he was banned from driving in the UK for six months after being caught speeding.

Sponsorship 
In 2011, Fàbregas signed a sponsorship deal with German sportswear and equipment supplier, Puma. He appeared in an advert for the new Puma PowerCat 1.12 in September 2011 and was one of the flagship wearers of Puma's PowerCat range of football boots. When the PowerCat was succeeded by the evoPower, again Fàbregas was the forefront of Puma's marketing campaign. In January 2014, the brand launched a C4 evoPower boot, specifically designed for just Fàbregas to wear. In 2012, Fàbregas signed an endorsement deal with Soul Electronics to sport Ludacris' signature line of headphones.

Other projects 
Fàbregas starred in his own one-time only television programme, called "The Cesc Fàbregas Show: Nike Live", that aired on 19 May 2008. The programme was sponsored by Nike and was shown on Sky Sports. The show featured Fàbregas in several sketches with then Arsenal teammates like Philippe Senderos and Nicklas Bendtner, as well as coach Arsène Wenger, Fàbregas' parents and Little Britain star Matt Lucas.

Punditry
For the 2018 World Cup, Fàbregas was a pundit for the BBC's coverage. He featured alongside Rio Ferdinand, Alan Shearer and Gary Lineker.

Career statistics

Club

International 

Scores and results list Spain's goal tally first, score column indicates score after each Fàbregas goal.

Honours 

Arsenal
FA Cup: 2004–05
FA Community Shield: 2004
Football League Cup runner-up: 2006–07
UEFA Champions League runner-up: 2005–06

Barcelona
La Liga: 2012–13
Copa del Rey: 2011–12
Supercopa de España: 2011, 2013
UEFA Super Cup: 2011
FIFA Club World Cup: 2011

Chelsea
Premier League: 2014–15, 2016–17
FA Cup: 2017–18; runner-up: 2016–17
Football League Cup: 2014–15

Monaco
Coupe de France runner-up: 2020–21

Spain
FIFA World Cup: 2010
UEFA European Championship: 2008, 2012

Individual

FIFA U-17 World Championship Golden Ball: 2003
FIFA U-17 World Championship Golden Shoe: 2003
UEFA European Under-17 Football Championship Golden Player: 2004
Bravo Award: 2006
Golden Boy: 2006
UEFA Team of the Year: 2006, 2008
Premier League Player of the Month: January 2007, September 2007
Arsenal Player of the Season: 2006–07, 2009−10
PFA Young Player of the Year: 2007–08
PFA Team of the Year: 2007–08 Premier League, 2009–10 Premier League
ESM Team of the Year: 2007–08, 2009–10, 2014–15
UEFA European Championship Team of the Tournament: 2008, 2012
FIFA FIFPro World XI 5th team: 2014

Orders
Prince of Asturias Awards: 2010
Gold Medal of the Royal Order of Sporting Merit: 2011

See also 
 List of footballers with 100 or more UEFA Champions League appearances
 List of men's footballers with 100 or more international caps

Notes 

Records began at the start of the 2006–07 season.

References

External links 

 
 Profile at the Chelsea F.C. website
 
 National team data at BDFutbol
 
 
 
 
 

1987 births
Living people
People from Maresme
Sportspeople from the Province of Barcelona
Spanish footballers
Footballers from Catalonia
Association football midfielders
CE Mataró players
Arsenal F.C. players
FC Barcelona players
Chelsea F.C. players
AS Monaco FC players
Como 1907 players
Premier League players
La Liga players
Ligue 1 players
Championnat National 2 players
Spain youth international footballers
Spain under-21 international footballers
Spain international footballers
Catalonia international footballers
2006 FIFA World Cup players
UEFA Euro 2008 players
2009 FIFA Confederations Cup players
2010 FIFA World Cup players
UEFA Euro 2012 players
2013 FIFA Confederations Cup players
2014 FIFA World Cup players
UEFA Euro 2016 players
UEFA European Championship-winning players
FIFA World Cup-winning players
FIFA Century Club
Spanish expatriate footballers
Spanish expatriate sportspeople in England
Spanish expatriate sportspeople in Monaco
Spanish expatriate sportspeople in Italy
Expatriate footballers in England
Expatriate footballers in Monaco
Expatriate footballers in Italy
Golden Boy winners
FA Cup Final players